The 1999 MTV Europe Music Awards were held in Dublin, Ireland at The Point. Ronan Keating returned as host, with performers including Mariah Carey singing "Heartbreaker", Britney Spears with "...Baby One More Time" & "(You Drive Me) Crazy", as well as The Cardigans, Jamiroquai, Marilyn Manson and The Corrs and show opener Iggy Pop.

Presenters included model and actress Carmen Electra, Christina Aguilera, Mary J. Blige, Fun Lovin' Criminals, Spice Girls' Geri Halliwell and actress Denise Richards.

Nominations
Winners are in bold text.

Regional nominations
Winners are in bold text.

Performances

Pre show
B*Witched — "Jesse Hold On"
Westlife — "If I Let You Go"

Main show
Iggy Pop — "Lust for Life"
Mariah Carey (featuring Missy Elliott and Da Brat) — "Heartbreaker"
Underworld — "Push Upstairs"
Britney Spears — "...Baby One More Time / (You Drive Me) Crazy" 
The Offspring — "The Kids Aren't Alright"
Jamiroquai — "King for a Day"
Whitney Houston — "Get It Back / My Love Is Your Love"
The Cardigans — "Erase/Rewind"
Puff Daddy — "Best Friend"
Ligabue — "L'odore del sesso"
The Corrs — "Radio"
Marilyn Manson — "Rock Is Dead"

Appearances
Denise Richards and Pierce Brosnan — presented Best Female
Geri Halliwell — presented Best Dance
Christina Aguilera and TQ — presented Best Hip-Hop
Carmen Electra and Fun Lovin' Criminals — presented Best Rock
Damon Albarn and Mary J. Blige — presented Best R&B
Lars Oostveen and Sasha — presented Best Nordic Act
Steps — presented Best Group
Alicia Silverstone — presented Best Pop
Anastasia Zampounidis and Missy Elliott - presented Best German Act
Eternal and Jovanotti — presented Best Male
The Jukka Brothers — presented Best Album
Kris & Kris and Andrea Pezzi — presented Best Italian Act
Brett Anderson and Des'ree — presented Breakthrough Artist
Cat Deeley and Edith Bowman — presented Best UK & Ireland Act
Mick Jagger — presented Free Your Mind Award
Five — presented Best Song
Armand Van Helden and The Edge — presented Best Video

See also
1999 MTV Video Music Awards

External links
Nominees

1999
1999 music awards
1999 in Irish music
MTV Europe Music Awards, 1999
November 1999 events in Europe